Lynnwood is a place located in Rockingham County, Virginia in the United States of America; Its latitude is 38°18'36" North; longitude  78°46'19" West.

Geography of Rockingham County, Virginia